The 2016–17 season was Alashkert's fifth season in the Armenian Premier League and tenth overall, of which Alashkert were defending Premier League champions, having won the title previous season. Alashkert retained their title, seeing off Gandzasar Kapan by 7 points, were knocked out of the Armenian Cup in the Quarterfinals and reached the Second Qualifying Round in their first appearance in the Champions League.

Season events
On 28 June, Alashkert drew 0-0 with Andorran Champions Santa Coloma in their first UEFA Champions League qualifier. In the second leg, on 5 July, Alashkert ran out 3-0 winners against 8-man Santa Coloma.

On 3 August, Alashkert announced the signing of Dmitri Kortava to a three-year contract from Luch-Energiya Vladivostok, However less than two weeks later, Kortava left Alashkert by mutual consent and signed for Neftekhimik Nizhnekamsk, with Yuriy Fomenko signing for Alashkert on the same day after his contract with Inter Baku had expired.

At the end of August 2016, Gevorg Poghosyan, Rafael Ghazaryan, Aram Loretsyan and Marat Daudov all left Alashkert to sign for Ararat Yerevan.

In December 2016, Abraham Khashmanyan returned to Alashkert as manager, having previously resigned from the role following their Armenian Cup defeat to Pyunik in the October.

In February 2017, Alashkert took Serbian defender Danijel Stojković, Iranian midfielder Arsia Jabbari, Serbian Forward Uroš Nenadović and Brazilian forward Valdir Da Silva Filho on trial during their winter training camp in Antalya.

Squad

Transfers

In

Out

Released

Competitions

Armenian Supercup

Premier League

Results summary

Results

Table

Armenian Cup

UEFA Champions League

Qualifying rounds

Statistics

Appearances and goals

|-
|colspan="14"|Players who left Alashkert during the season:

|}

Goal scorers

Clean sheets

Disciplinary Record

References

FC Alashkert seasons
Alashkert
Alashkert